Edward Clisbee was an actor in silent films. His roles included recurring parts in several serials. He was a police chief in one series of two-reel films. He also portrayed Hunchback Charlie. He appeared in a film series based on Bronson Howard stories.

Filmography
The Cave Man's War (1913)
The Big Horn Massacre (1913)
Chinese Death-Thorn
The Boer War (film) (1914), as General Lambert
The Pitfall (1915 film) (1915)
The Diamond Broker (1915)
An Enemy of Mankind (1915)
Stingaree (1915), a 12-episode serial
The Villain Worshipper
The Purification of Mulfera
The Moth and the Star
The Black Hole of Glenrenald
The Ore Plunderers (1916)
The Social Pirates (1916), a serial
The Little Mone Carlo
The Duel in the Desert (film) (1916)
On the Brink of War
The False Prophet
The Girl from.Frisco
Witch of the Dark House (1916)
A Whirlwind of Whiskers (1917)
The Man from Tia Juana (1917)
The Tyrant of Chiracahua (1917)
The Fate of Juan Garcia (1917), as Juan Garcia
The Lost Legion of the Border (1917)
The Black Rider of Tasajara (1917)
The Ghost of the Desert (1917)
The Door in the Mountain (1917)
The Line Rider (1917)
The Onion Magnate's Revenge (1917)
The Further Adventures of Stingaree (1917), a serial
The Tracking of Stingaree
The Vulture of Skull Mountain
The Skeleton Canyon Raid
The Wolf of Los Alamos
The Homesteaders' Feud

References

American male silent film actors
20th-century American male actors
Year of birth missing
Year of death missing